The order-5 truncated pentagonal hexecontahedron is a convex polyhedron with 72 faces: 60 hexagons and 12 pentagons triangular, with 210 edges, and 140 vertices. Its dual is the pentakis snub dodecahedron.

It is Goldberg polyhedron {5+,3}2,1 in the icosahedral family, with chiral symmetry. The relationship between pentagons steps into 2 hexagons away, and then a turn with one more step.

It is a Fullerene C140.

Construction 
It is explicitly called a pentatruncated pentagonal hexecontahedron since only the valence-5 vertices of the pentagonal hexecontahedron are truncated.

Its topology can be constructed in Conway polyhedron notation as t5gD and more simply wD as a whirled dodecahedron, reducing original pentagonal faces and adding 5 distorted hexagons around each, in clockwise or counter-clockwise forms. This picture shows its flat construction before the geometry is adjusted into a more spherical form. The snub can create a (5,3) geodesic polyhedron by k5k6.

Related polyhedra 
The whirled dodecahedron creates more polyhedra by basic Conway polyhedron notation. The zip whirled dodecahedron makes a chamfered truncated icosahedron, and Goldberg (4,1). Whirl applied twice produces Goldberg (5,3), and applied twice with reverse orientations produces goldberg (7,0).

See also 
 Truncated pentagonal icositetrahedron t4gC

References 

 Fourth class of convex equilateral polyhedron with polyhedral symmetry related to fullerenes and viruses, Stan Schein and  James Maurice Gaye, PNAS, Early Edition doi: 10.1073/pnas.1310939111

External links 
 VRML polyhedral generator Try "t5gI" (Conway polyhedron notation)

Goldberg polyhedra
Pentagonal tilings
Snub tilings
Fullerenes